Union Township is one of the fourteen townships of Morgan County, Ohio, United States.  The 2000 census found 607 people in the township.

Geography
Located in the western part of the county, it borders the following townships:
Deerfield Township - north
Malta Township - northeast
Penn Township - east
Marion Township - southeast
Homer Township - south
Monroe Township, Perry County - west
Bearfield Township, Perry County - northwest

No municipalities are located in Union Township.

Name and history
It is one of twenty-seven Union Townships statewide.

Government
The township is governed by a three-member board of trustees, who are elected in November of odd-numbered years to a four-year term beginning on the following January 1. Two are elected in the year after the presidential election and one is elected in the year before it. There is also an elected township fiscal officer, who serves a four-year term beginning on April 1 of the year after the election, which is held in November of the year before the presidential election. Vacancies in the fiscal officership or on the board of trustees are filled by the remaining trustees.

As of 2009, the trustees are Steve Campbell, Christopher Nichols, and Timothy Thompson, and the clerk is Marilyn Homer.

References

External links
County website

Townships in Morgan County, Ohio
Townships in Ohio